The 2012 United States Junior Curling Championships were held from January 28 to February 4 at the Madison Curling Club in Madison, Wisconsin. The winners, the teams skipped by Stephen Dropkin and Cory Christensen, represented the United States at the 2012 World Junior Curling Championships in Östersund, Sweden.

Men

Teams
The teams are listed as follows:

Round Robin Standings
Final Round Robin Standings

Round Robin Results
All times listed in Central Standard Time (UTC-6).

Draw 1
Sunday, January 29, 8:00 am

Draw 3
Sunday, January 29, 4:00 pm

Draw 5
Monday, January 30, 8:00 am

Draw 7
Monday, January 30, 4:00 pm

Draw 9
Tuesday, January 31, 9:00 am

Draw 11
Tuesday, January 31, 7:00 pm

Draw 13
Wednesday, February 1, 12:00 pm

Draw 15
Wednesday, February 1, 8:00 pm

Draw 17
Thursday, February 2, 12:00 pm

Tiebreaker
Thursday, February 2, 8:00 pm

Playoffs

1 vs. 2 Game
Friday, February 3, 2:00 pm

3 vs. 4 Game
Friday, February 3, 2:00 pm

Semifinal
Friday, February 3, 7:00 pm

Final
Saturday, February 4, 10:00 am

Women

Teams
The teams are listed as follows:

Round Robin Standings
Final Round Robin Standings

Round Robin Results
All times listed in Central Standard Time (UTC-6).

Draw 2
Sunday, January 29, 12:00 pm

Draw 4
Sunday, January 29, 8:00 pm

Draw 6
Monday, January 30, 12:00 pm

Draw 8
Monday, January 30, 8:00 pm

Draw 10
Tuesday, January 31, 2:00 pm

Draw 12
Wednesday, February 1, 8:00 am

Draw 14
Wednesday, February 1, 4:00 pm

Draw 16
Thursday, February 2, 8:00 am

Draw 18
Thursday, February 2, 4:00 pm

Playoffs

1 vs. 2 Game
Friday, February 3, 2:00 pm

3 vs. 4 Game
Friday, February 3, 2:00 pm

Semifinal
Friday, February 3, 7:00 pm

Final
Saturday, February 4, 2:00 pm

References

External links

2012 in curling
Curling in Wisconsin